Irene Tinagli (born 16 April 1974) is an Italian economist and politician, a Member of the European Parliament since 2019. She serves as chairwoman of the European Parliament Committee on Economic and Monetary Affairs.

Career
Tinagli was a consultant for the United Nations Department of Economic and Social Affairs, contributing to the drafting of the book Understanding Knowledge Societies, published in 2005 by the United Nations. 

In 2009, Tinagli began to teach Management and Organizations at the Charles III University of Madrid. She is a Member of the Advisory Council of the Florence School of Banking and Finance (European University), on the Board of Trustees of Friends of Europe, and a Member of the Advisory Board of the Center for Social Norms and Behavioral Dynamics of the University of Pennsylvania.

Member of the Italian Parliament, 2013–2018
Tinagli was elected MP among the ranks of Civic Choice in the 2013 general election. In February 2015, together with other deputies, she left Civic Choice and joined the parliamentary group of the Democratic Party. On 17 March 2021, she was appointed deputy secretary of the Democratic Party by its new national secretary Enrico Letta.

Member of the European Parliament, 2019–present
In 2019, Tinagli was the candidate with the Democratic Party in the European election and was elected MEP with 106,710 preferences. After intending to work at the Committee on International Trade, she was elected as chair of the Economic and monetary affairs committee to succeed Roberto Gualtieri following the appointment of Gualtieri as finance minister on 5 September.

Other activities
 Friends of Europe, Member of the Board of Trustees (since 2020)

Recognition
In March 2010, Tinagli was named Young Global Leader by the World Economic Forum for "professional skills, commitment to society, and a potential contribution to shaping the future of the world."

Publications 
Europe in the Creative Age (con R. Florida), Demos, London, 2004.
Sweden in the Creative Age (con R. Florida, P. Strom, E. Whalqvist), University of Gothenburg, School of Economics, Business and Law, 2007
Talento da svendere, Turin, Einaudi, 2008.
L'Italia è un Paese bloccato. Muoviamoci! La mobilità sociale secondo Italia Futura, Rome, Italia Futura, 2009.
Giovani, al lavoro! Le proposte di Italia Futura per l'occupazione giovanile, with Stefano Micelli and Marco Simoni, Rome, Italia Futura, 2010.
Norway in the Creative Age. Research Report, Staten vegvesen & Abelia, Oslo, 2012
Un futuro a colori. Scoprire nuove opportunità di lavoro e vivere felici, Rizzoli editore, 2014.
La grande ignoranza. Dall'uomo qualunque al ministro qualunque, l'ascesa dell'incompetenza e il declino dell'Italia. Rizzoli editore, 2019.

References

1974 births
Living people
21st-century Italian politicians
Civic Choice politicians
Democratic Party (Italy) politicians
People from Empoli
Bocconi University alumni
Heinz College of Information Systems and Public Policy alumni
MEPs for Italy 2019–2024
Fulbright alumni